Ken Shorter (born 1945) is an Australian actor best known for playing the title role in the biker film Stone (1974), and You Can't See 'round Corners (1969).

Television appearances include Skippy, Play School, Matlock Police, Homicide, Division 4, G.P., Casualty and The Bill. Films include Ned Kelly and Sunday Too Far Away, and the Disney film Dragonslayer (1981).

Credits
You Can't See 'Round Corners (TV series) (1967)
You Can't See 'round Corners (1969)
Ned Kelly (1970)
Play School (1960s-?)
Stone (1974)
Sunday Too Far Away (1975)
Dragonslayer (1981)
Dragonheart: A New Beginning (2000)

References

External links

Ken Shorter at National Film and Sound Archive

20th-century Australian male actors
1945 births
Living people
Australian male television actors
Australian male film actors
Date of birth missing (living people)
Australian children's television presenters